Lullingstone is a village in the county of Kent, England. It is best known for its castle, Roman villa and its public golf course.

Lullingstone was a civil parish until 1955, when it was annexed to Eynsford. The parish was in Axstane Hundred and its successor Dartford Rural District.

History

Pre-Roman 
It is believed that an Iron Age hill fort is sited on the hill above the castle, although this is unconfirmed.

Roman Occupation 
Lullingstone Roman villa was discovered in 1939, and is believed to have been built around 100 AD. It contains some of the finest excavated remains of a Roman villa in Britain, including a Romano-Christian chapel, displaying some of the earliest evidence of Christianity in Britain.

20th century
Nearby is the site of a decoy airfield for the nearby Biggin Hill airfield. Known as a Q-site,  this was intended to entice bombers to misinterpret it as Biggin Hill.

In 1937 a plan was announced to create an airport the size of Heathrow in Lullingstone. The area of land had been reserved and construction of Lullingstone railway station to serve the site began. The proposal was abandoned at the outbreak of World War II.

Lullingstone Country Park was established in the 20th century.

Nearest places
 Farningham
 Eynsford
 Swanley
 Sevenoaks
 Chelsfield
 Petts Wood
 St Mary Cray
 Farnborough

References

External links

 uk-golfguide.com
 kentattractions.co.uk
 lullingstonecastle.co.uk
 kentarchaeology.org.uk

Villages in Kent